Ruellia pohlii (syn. Dipteracanthus pohlii Nees) is a plant native to the Cerrado vegetation of Brazil. This plant is cited in Flora Brasiliensis by Carl Friedrich Philipp von Martius.

External links
Flora Brasiliensis: Dipteracanthus pohlii

pohlii
Flora of Brazil